The  was the 2019 edition of NHK's television special Kōhaku Uta Gassen, held on December 31 live from NHK Hall (Tokyo, Japan), and broadcast in Japan through NHK General Television and NHK Radio 1, and worldwide through TV Japan (US only) and NHK World Premium. This is the first edition in the Reiwa period. The WHITE TEAM won this event.

Events leading up to Broadcast 
This is the last year using the theme , which remained unchanged since the 67th edition (2016), in support of the upcoming 2020 Summer Olympics and 2020 Summer Paralympics.

First details about this year's event were revealed on October 3. The event ran from 19:15 to 23:45 JST, with a 5-minute break for the latest news. NHK chairman Ryoichi Ueda declared: "First in Reiwa Period, 70th overall. I hope that the 70th Kōhaku Uta Gassen will remain in the hearts of many people, worthly of commemorative event".

On October 18, actress Haruka Ayase and Arashi member Sho Sakurai were announced as captains from Red and White Team. Teruyoshi Uchimura served as mediator for the third time in a row.

On November 11, Hinatazaka46 is announced as the first artist confirmed for this edition. The full lineup was revealed on November 14. Eight artists debuted in this edition: Official Hige Dandism, Generations from Exile Tribe, Masaki Suda, King Gnu, Kis-My-Ft2, Foorin, Hinatazaka46 and the anisong singer LiSA. Hibari Misora was revived using AI technology to perform a brand new song, "Arekara", written by Yasushi Akimoto, most notably for producing idol groups such as AKB48.

On November 22, Mariya Takeuchi was announced as a performer to celebrate the 40th anniversary of her career and perform "Inochi no Uta".

On November 25, Radwimps was announced as a performer due to great success of the animated feature Tenki no Ko.

On November 27, the Kōhaku Uratalk Channel were announced.

On December 18, the judges were announced with the voting system from last year still unchanged.

On December 20, the full song list was revealed. The performance order was revealed on December 27, with Foorin opening the show and Arashi serving as "Ootori". Rehearsals for the performances began on December 29.

Personnel

Presenters
 Red Team: Haruka Ayase
 White Team: Sho Sakurai
 Moderators: Teruyoshi Uchimura & Mayuko Wakuda

Other program staff
 Kōhaku Uratalk Channel: Ryota Yamasato, Yuki Sugiura, Naomi Watanabe

Judges
 Naoya Inoue 
 Emiko Kaminuma 
 Sandwichman 
 Hinako Shibuno 
 Daiya Seto 
 Kei Tanaka 
 Erika Toda 
 Maya Nakanishi 
 Hiroki Hasegawa 
 Suzu Hirose 
 Akira Yoshino

Guests
 Oshiri Tantei
 Magus 
 DJ Koo
 Akira Ishida
 Tōko Miura 
 Shunichi Tokura 
 Hibari Misora 
 Mizuki Nakamoto 
 Diamond Yukai 
 Tomoya Nakamura & Haruka Kinoshita 
 Kiss 
 AKB48 Group World Selections: BNK48, CGM48, SGO48, JKT48, DEL48, MNL48, Team SH & Team TP
 Shinya Kiyozuka 
 Matt 
 Mayu Kishima 
 Shinji Takeda 
 Takashi Okamura 
 Chico-chan 
 Chocolate Planet 
 Kosuke Kitajima 
 Masako Nozawa 

Additional crew
 Yasushi Akimoto 
 Yamaha Corporation 
 Tsunaki Mihara & The New Breed

Artist lineup
 Performers
  

Special Performances
 Mariya Takeuchi – "Inochi no Uta"
 Yumi Matsutoya – "No Side"
 Beat Takeshi – "Asakusa Kid"

Songs Performed on Medleys
 Masaharu Fukuyama: "Hello", "Niji", "Zero"
 Twice: "TT -Japanese ver.-", "Fancy -Japanese ver.-"
 Da Pump: "P.A.R.T.Y. ~Universe Festival~", "U.S.A."
 King & Prince: "Cinderella Girl", "Koi-Wazurai"
 Kanjani Eight: "Zukkoke Otoko Michi", "Maemuki Scream"
 Perfume: "Fusion", "Polyrhythm"
 Radwimps: "Grand Escape", "Daijoubu"
 Yuzu: "Eikō no Kakehashi", "Seimei"
 Kiyoshi Hikawa: "Daijōbu", "Genkai Toppa x Survivor"
 Seiko Matsuda: "Jikan no Kuni no Alice", "Rock'n Rouge", "Cherry Blossom", "Natsu no Tobira"
 Misia: "Ai no Katachi", "Into the Light", "Everything"
 Arashi: "Arashi", "Turning Up"

Special performances
 Arashi – "Kite"
 Hibari Misora – "Arekara"
 Yoshikiss  – "Rock and Roll All Nite"

Disney Section – performers
 Mizuki Nakamoto – "Into the Unknown ~Kokoro no Mama ni~"
 Diamond Yukai – "Kimi wa Tomodachi (You've Got a Friend in Me)"
 Tomoya Nakamura & Haruka Kinoshita – "A Whole New World"

Not returning this year
 Red Team: Aimyon, Daoko, Kana Nishino, Yumi Matsutoya, Yoshiki ft Sarah Brightman
 White Team: Exile, Suchmos, Sandaime J Soul Brothers, Sekai no Owari, Sexy Zone, Yoshiki ft Hyde, Kenshi Yonezu.

Voting system and results
The current voting system, implemented in the 69th edition (2018) was unchanged. As it was last year, the winner was determined within 3 points.
 Viewers: 1 point for the team who get more votes through 1-Seg.
 Audience: 1 point for the team who get more votes through the NHK Hall audience.
 Judges: 1 point for the team who gets 6 or more votes from 11 judges.
Voting was carried after all artists performed. The team that gets 2 or more votes were declared winner of the 70th Kōhaku.

References

NHK Kōhaku Uta Gassen events
2019 in Japanese music
2019 in Japanese television